Plectroscapoides multituberculatus is a species of beetle in the family Cerambycidae, and the only species in the genus Plectroscapoides. It was described by Teocchi in 1996.

References

Stenobiini
Beetles described in 1996